Randy Fuller may refer to:
 Randy Fuller (American football)
 Randy Fuller (musician)